John Graham, 4th Earl of Montrose (1573–1626) was a Scottish nobleman, Earl of Montrose from 1608 to the 1620s. He was for a time Lord President of the Privy Council of Scotland.

He was a Catholic, as the English ambassador William Asheby noted in November 1589, on the death of his uncle Mungo Graham, Master Household to James VI.

In January 1595, in revenge for the death of his kinsman John Graham of Hallyards, he fought with James Sandilands on the Royal Mile. Sandilands' brother-in-law William Crauford, brother of the laird of Carse was killed.

He was at court in Royston in England in 1614 and the court physician Théodore de Mayerne treated him for melancholy.

Marriage and Family
He married Margaret Ruthven, daughter of William Ruthven, 1st Earl of Gowrie and Dorothea Stewart. Their children included:
James Graham, 5th Earl of Montrose, later 1st Marquess of Montrose.
Lilias Graham, married Sir John Colquhoun of Luss, 1st Baronet.
Elizabeth Graham
Margaret Graham married Archibald Napier, 1st Lord Napier of Merchiston
Dorothea Graham married Sir James Rollo, Younger of Duncrub.
Katherine Graham
Beatrix Graham married David Drummond, 3rd Lord Maderty.

References

1573 births
1626 deaths
Year of birth unknown
17th-century Scottish peers
Members of the Parliament of Scotland 1617
Earls of Montrose